The 2019 UCI Europe Tour was the fifteenth season of the UCI Europe Tour. The 2019 season began on 31 January 2019 with the Trofeo Porreres, Felanitx, Ses Salines, Campos and ended on 20 October 2019.

Throughout the season, points are awarded to the top finishers of stages within stage races and the final general classification standings of each of the stages races and one-day events. The quality and complexity of a race also determines how many points are awarded to the top finishers, the higher the UCI rating of a race, the more points are awarded.

The UCI ratings from highest to lowest are as follows:
 Multi-day events: 2.HC, 2.1 and 2.2
 One-day events: 1.HC, 1.1 and 1.2

Events

January

February

March

April

May

June

July

August

September

October

References

External links
 

 
UCI Europe Tour
UCI Europe Tour
UCI